Serge may refer to:

Serge (fabric), a type of twill fabric
Serge (llama) (born 2005),  a llama in the Cirque Franco-Italien and internet meme
Serge (name), a masculine given name (includes a list of people with this name)
Serge (post), a hitching post used among the Buryats and Yakuts
Serge synthesizer, a modular synthesizer

See also
Overlock, a type of stitch known as "serger" in North America
Surge (disambiguation)
Serg (disambiguation)